Tadeusz "Tadek" Marek (1908–1982) was a Polish automobile engineer, known for his Aston Martin engines.

Marek was from Kraków and studied engineering at Technische Universität Berlin before working for Fiat in Poland and also for General Motors. Despite a serious racing accident in 1928, he raced the 1937 Monte Carlo Rally in a Fiat 1100 followed by a Lancia Aprilia in 1938 and an Opel Olympia in 1939.  Driving a Chevrolet Master sedan, he won the XII Rally Poland (1939) before moving to Great Britain in 1940 to join the Polish Army. He joined the Centurion tank Meteor engine development (1944), but returned to Germany, working for United Nations Relief and Rehabilitation Administration.

In 1949 he joined the Austin Motor Company, and eventually joined Aston Martin (1954). He is notable for his work on three engines, developing the alloy straight six-cylinder engine of the Aston Martin DBR2 racing car (1956), redesigning the company's venerable straight six-cylinder Lagonda (1957), and developing the Aston Martin V8 engine (1968).

The Lagonda engine received a new cast iron block with top seating liners, used in the DB Mark III that debuted in 1957. After modifications, the DBR2 engine was used in the DB4 (1958), DB5 (1963), DB6 (1965) and DBS (1967). The V8 first appeared in the DBS V8 in 1969, going on to power Aston Martins for part of five decades before being retired in 2000. A prototype was fitted in the mid-'60s in a one-off DB5 extended 4" after the doors and driven by Marek personally, and a normally 6-cylinder Aston Martin DB7 was equipped with a V8 unit in 1998.

Marek and his wife moved to Italy in 1968, where he died in 1982.

References

Engineers from Kraków
Automotive engineers
Aston Martin
1908 births
1982 deaths
Polish emigrants to Italy